Kandel is a town in Rhineland-Palatinate, Germany

Kandel may also refer to:

Kandel (Verbandsgemeinde), a municipality in Germany
Kandel (mountain), a mountain in the Black Forest, Germany
Kandel (surname), including a list of persons with the name
Kandel, Iran, a village in South Khorasan Province, Iran

See also 
Kandle (disambiguation)
Candel (disambiguation)
Candle (disambiguation)